The Admiral was a named passenger train of the Pennsylvania Railroad and its successor Penn Central which operated between Chicago, Illinois and New York City. The Admiral began on April 27, 1941, when the Pennsylvania renamed the eastbound Advance General.

Advance General
The Advance General was a train operated by the Pennsylvania Railroad (PRR). It was inaugurated in 1940, and was a second section of the PRR's popular General, and was meant to take the coaches, then only being carried eastbound, and make that train an all-Pullman train. In 1941, it was renamed the Admiral.

Admiral 
The new train was eastbound-only until a year later on April 26, 1942, when the Pennsylvania added a westbound counterpart. The Admiral carried both sleepers and coaches plus a diner. After World War II, the Pennsylvania put the Admiral on a 17-hour schedule between Chicago and New York along with the Broadway Limited, Trail Blazer, General and Pennsylvanian. At the time the Admiral carried transcontinental sleeping cars which it exchanged in Chicago with the California Zephyr and other California-bound trains. Mounting losses on its passenger operations led the Pennsylvania to reduce service on the Admiral. From April 29, 1956, onwards the Admiral operated as a local, making more intermediate stops with a longer overall running time. The westbound train ended altogether in 1958. The remaining eastbound Admiral lost its dining car in 1966 and the last of its sleeping cars in 1967, leaving it with mail and express cars, coaches and a snack bar. The eastbound Admiral remained after the merger of the Pennsylvania with the New York Central Railroad as the Penn Central and the train was discontinued on the formation of Amtrak on May 1, 1971.

References 

Night trains of the United States
Railway services introduced in 1941
Passenger trains of the Pennsylvania Railroad
Named passenger trains of the United States
Railway services discontinued in 1971
Railway services introduced in 1940
Railway services discontinued in 1941
Passenger rail transportation in Pennsylvania
Passenger rail transportation in New York (state)
Passenger rail transportation in New Jersey
Passenger rail transportation in Ohio
Passenger rail transportation in Indiana
Passenger rail transportation in Illinois